Klassfesten ("The Class Reunion") is a 2002 Swedish comedy/drama film written and directed by Måns Herngren and Hannes Holm. The film stars Björn Kjellman, Cecilia Frode, Inday Ba, Henrik Hjelt, Lisa Lindgren and Ulf Friberg. The film was released on 27 February 2002 in Sweden.

Plot 
20 years after Magnus Edkvist (Björn Kjellman) graduated from the ninth grade in Hagsätra, he gets an invitation to a class reunion. He declines the invitation, because he doesn't want to relive some of the most embarrassing moments of his life. Magnus rather stays home with his wife Lollo (Cecilia Frode) and his daughter. But when Magnus starts to think about his teenage crush, Hillevi (Inday Ba), and whether she will go or not. He decides to go to the reunion, in hope that Hillevi will show up.

Cast 
Björn Kjellman as Magnus Edkvist
Inday Ba as Hillevi
Cecilia Frode as Lollo Edkvist, Magnus wife
Lisa Lindgren as Jeanette
Ulf Friberg as Tommy
Henrik Hjelt as Ove
Jimmy Lindström as Lill-Micke
Johan Ehn as Jonas
Jessica Forsberg as Pia
Ingrid Luterkort as The teacher
Urban Bergsten as Leffe lort
Jan Åström as Micke P
Frida Öhman as Alva, Magnus and Lollos daughter 
Oscar Taxén as Young Magnus
Sacha Baptiste as Young Hillevi
Anders Timell as Fabbe

Music 
The music in the film is "Calleth You, Cometh I" and "Topsy Kaiser", both songs made by the Swedish band The Ark. The Ark's singer Ola Salo has written the two songs. He wrote "Calleth You, Cometh I" together with Peter Kvint.

Accolades 
Cecilia Frode won the Guldbagge Award in 2003 for Best Supporting Actress.

External links 
 
 

2002 films
Swedish comedy-drama films
2002 comedy-drama films
Films directed by Hannes Holm
2000s Swedish films